Tergipedidae is a family of sea slugs, aeolid nudibranchs, marine gastropod molluscs in the superfamily Fionoidea (according to the  of the Gastropoda by Bouchet & Rocroi, 2005).

Taxonomic history
The bratos in this family were moved to the family Fionidae as a result of a molecular phylogenetics study. This was reversed and the family Tergipedidae restricted to the one nominate genus in 2017 as a result of a re-evaluation of this study and further DNA results.

Genera 
Genera within the family Tergipedidae include:
 Tergipes Cuvier, 1805

Genera and subfamilies currently brought into synonymy
 Subfamily Tergipedinae: synonym of Tergipedidae Bergh, 1889

References

External links